Islam is one of the smallest minority faiths in Costa Rica, whose state religion is Catholic Christianity. Without an official number by any state entity, it is considered that the number of Muslims in Costa Rica could be between 1000 and 1500 people, mostly emigrants from Algeria, India, Iraq, Iran, Lebanon, Morocco, Egypt , Somalia, Pakistan, Palestine and Syria. This number includes Muslims who have immigrated to Costa Rican territory as well as those Costa Ricans who have embraced the Islamic faith through conversion, whose number is estimated to be at around 100. The number of Muslims corresponding to the Sunni and Shia factions is also unknown, although it is generally considered that the Sunnis are the majority.

There are three mosques in Costa Rica; the Omar Mosque and Islamic Center of Costa Rica (Sunni) located in the Montelimar district in the Goicoechea Canton, which meets on Friday afternoons and is managed by the Muslim Cultural Center of Costa Rica. This was the first in the country and was founded in 2002. It is officiated by the Egyptian-born Sheikh Omar Abdel Aziz and affiliated with the Islamic World Educational, Scientific and Cultural Organization based in Rabat, Morocco. The Light and Faith Mosque, also Sunni, is located in downtown San José and it is presided over by Jennifer Rashida Torres. The Shiite mosque is sponsored by the Sahar Cultural Center and is located also in San José. Before the foundation of the Shia mosque, the Shiites congregated to pray in a private house or attended the Sunni mosque without problems. Ahmadiya Muslims also have a center in Costa Rica.

See also
 Religion in Costa Rica

References

 
Islam by country